Let It Happen is a B-sides and rarities album by punk rock band MxPx.

Contents
The songs on this compilation originally appeared on the 17 7-inch, Punk Rawk Show 7-inch, Small Town Minds 7-inch, North American Punk Series Vol. 4 split 7-inch with the McCrackins, I'm Your Biggest Fan  vol. 1 compilation, On the Cover double 10-inch, Teenage Politics, Move to Bremerton EP, and Life In General pre-release teaser. Four of the songs had not been previously released: "Important Enough to Mention", "Honest Answers", "Late Last Night" and "Biased Bigotry". The sound clip at the beginning of this version of "Chick Magnet" is from the film Mallrats. The songs were all originally produced by either Bob Moon or Aaron Sprinkle. Steve Kravac served as producer for the compilation and provided remixes.

Release
Let It Happen was released on November 10, 1998 through Tooth & Nail Records.

On November 7, 2006, it was announced the group had re-signed with Tooth & Nail Records. In the same announcement, it was revealed that Let It Happen would be re-released on November 21. This deluxe edition included six different tracks, with three new songs produced by Aaron Sprinkle, and also three original demos of songs that were re-recorded for the first album, Pokinatcha. To make room, the final six songs from the original Let It Happen were taken off. The deluxe edition also includes a DVD with twelve music videos.

Track listings
Except for song no. 4 and 5, all songs written by Mike Herrera.

Original release
 "Never Learn"
 "Begin to Start"
 "Swing Set Girl"
 "Sick Boy" (Social Distortion cover)
 "Oh Donna" (Ritchie Valens cover)
 "Small Town Minds"
 "First Class Mail"
 "Can't See Not Saying"
 "GSF"
 "Thoughts and Ideas"
 "Easier Said than Done"
 "Rock and Roll Girl"
 "Important Enough to Mention"
 "Elvis is Dead"
 "Lifetime Enlightenment"
 "Let it Happen"
 "Hot and Cold"
 "So Kill Me"
 "Suggestion Box"
 "Creation"
 "Want Ad"
 "Honest Answers"
 "Late Last Night"
 "Biased Bigotry"
 "Circumstance"
 "Do Your Feet Hurt?" (critter version)
 "Move to Bremerton" (extended version)
 "Chick Magnet" (demo version)
 "Sorry So Sorry" (demo version)
 "Christalena" (demo version)
 "South Bound" (demo version)
 "Life in General" (demo version)

Deluxe edition
CD
 "Role Remodeling" (new)
 "Prozac" (new)
 "Your Turn" (new)
 "Never Learn"
 "Begin to Start"
 "Swing Set Girl"
 "Sick Boy"
 "Oh Donna"
 "Small Town Minds"
 "First Class Mail"
 "Can't See Not Saying"
 "GSF"
 "Thoughts and Ideas"
 "Easier Said than Done"
 "Rock and Roll Girl"
 "Important Enough to Mention"
 "Elvis is Dead"
 "Lifetime Enlightenment"
 "Let it Happen"
 "Hot and Cold"
 "So Kill Me"
 "Suggestion Box"
 "Creation"
 "Want Ad" (alternate version)
 "Honest Answers"
 "Late Last Night"
 "Biased Bigotry"
 "Circumstance"
 "Do Your Feet Hurt?" (critter version)
 "Twisted Words" (original demo)
 "Suggestion Box" (original demo)
 "Too Much Thinking" (original demo)

DVD
 "Money Tree"
 "Doing Time"
 "Move to Bremerton"
 "Chick Magnet"
 "Punk Rawk Show"
 "Want Ad"
 "Teenage Politics"
 "Responsibility"
 "I'm OK, You're OK"
 "Heard That Sound"
 "Wrecking Hotel Rooms"
 "Grey Skies Turn Blue"

Personnel
Mike Herrera - bass, vocals
Tom Wisniewski - guitars
Yuri Ruley - drums

References

B-side compilation albums
MxPx compilation albums
1998 compilation albums
Tooth & Nail Records compilation albums